Polycynodon is an extinct genus of therocephalians from the Late Permian of South Africa. It is known from the Cistecephalus Assemblage Zone. The type species was first described as Octocynodon elegans by South African paleontologist Robert Broom in 1940, but the name Octocynodon was preoccupied by a genus of labrid fish first described in 1904. Along with John T. Robinson, Broom instated Polycynodon as a replacement name for O. elegans in 1948. Polycynodon is classified in Baurioidea, although its relationship to other baurioid therocephalians is uncertain.

References

Lopingian synapsids of Africa
Baurioids
Therocephalia genera
Lopingian genus first appearances
Lopingian genus extinctions